Summer is a 2008 film directed by Kenneth Glenaan and starring Robert Carlyle and Rachael Blake. It tells the story of a lively and wayward man coming to terms with the realities of age and death. Shaun (Carlyle) has to confront past demons as his first love re-appears and his best friend, Daz, is terminally ill. The film is set mainly in the present and includes reflections on his childhood in flashbacks.

Awards
 BAFTA Scotland Award – Best Directing in Film or Television – Won
 BAFTA Scotland Award – Best Feature Film – Won
 BAFTA Scotland Award – Best Acting Performance in Film, Robert Carlyle – Nominee

References

External links
Official website

 

2008 films
2008 drama films
British drama films
Vertigo Films films
2000s English-language films
2000s British films